The Scottish National Entitlement Card (NEC) is a Scotland-wide smart card scheme run by Scottish Local Authorities on behalf of the Scottish Government. It is predominantly operated as a concessionary travel pass, but can also act as Proof of Age for young people (Young Scot NEC) and give access to civic services such as libraries and leisure centres depending on the local authority.

History 
In 2000, the then Scottish Executive assigned budget for a Modernising Government Fund intended to improve public services; part of this budget was targeted towards the development of a voluntary public sector smartcard, an initiative that in 2003 was highlighted as an area to be developed further by local authorities. In parallel, s.40 of the Transport (Scotland) Act 2005 provided for the introduction of national travel concession schemes that would be funded centrally rather than by local authorities, and it was decided that what was by then known as the National Entitlement Card would be used to administer the travel scheme when it was introduced in 2006.

Privacy concerns 
The parallel development of a local authority administered Citizen Account under the Modernising Government Fund had by 2006 articulated a need to assign their records a Unique Citizen Reference Number or UCRN, and envisaged associating the Account with "nationally compatible smart cards as service access tokens". The UCRN is maintained as part of Scotland's National Health Service Central Register (NHSCR) data; access to a subset of the Register by Scottish Local Authorities was enabled by s.57 of the Local Electoral Administration and Registration Services (Scotland) Act 2006 (the LEARS act). Each Scot on NHSCR is assigned a Unique Citizen Reference Number (UCRN) which local authorities have access to under certain conditions.  As the UCRN itself may be linked to NHSCR data and used for verification purposes, a proposed expansion of its use in 2014 raised fears that the UCRN will form the backbone of a Scottish identity register and persistent identification of individuals across Scottish state datasets. The Open Rights Group accused the proposal of creating "a national ID system by the backdoor", despite the Scottish Government's opposition to the UK's previous identity cards scheme. In February 2017 it was announced that the proposed expansion was not to go ahead.

National concessionary travel

Older and Disabled Persons
The Scottish NEC allows those Scottish residents with certain disabilities or aged over 60 years old to access free travel within Scotland on nearly all local bus and scheduled long distance coach services (including the morning rush hour) but excluding premium fare night buses and City Sightseeing Buses. Travel is also valid on bus services that start/terminate in Carlisle and Berwick upon Tweed so long as the service travels to/from Scotland.

Eligibility Criteria - Disabled Cardholders

Main Cardholder

Entitlement for free bus travel with the NEC is dependent on being a Scottish resident, at least 5 years old, and meeting one of the following criteria:

 Receiving Disability Living Allowance under the higher rate of mobility or higher/middle rate of care.
 Receiving the standard or enhanced rate of Personal Independence Payment.
 Receiving Attendance Allowance.
 Living in a care or residential home or hospital.
 Being a Blue Badge holder.
 Being profoundly or severely deaf.
 Having a visual impairment.
 Been told not to drive based on medical grounds.
 Having a mental illness, learning difficulty or personality disorder recognised under the Mental Health (Care and Treatment) (Scotland) Act 2003 which has lasted for more than 12 months.
 Having a terminal illness.
 Having a progressive degenerative condition.
 Having lost one or more limbs.
 Being an injured veteran with mobility problems.
 Receiving a War Pensioner Mobility Supplement.

Companion to Cardholder

If the main cardholder meets any of the following criteria, they are also entitled to have a Companion travel with them, usually attracting the same discount as the main cardholder:

 Main cardholder receives the higher or middle rate of the care component of Disability Living Allowance.
 Main cardholder receives the standard or enhanced rate of daily living component of Personal Independence Payment.
 Main cardholder receives Attendance Allowance
 Main cardholder is registered blind.
 Main cardholder lives in a care or residential home and receive the higher or middle rate of the care component Disability Living Allowance or Attendance Allowance.

Eligibility Criteria - 60+ Cardholders 
To get a National Entitlement Card you must be:

 Aged 60 years or older and
 Resident in Scotland

Young People 
Until 31st January 2022, all Scottish residents aged 16-18 years old and full-time volunteers aged between 19 and 26 years old were able to get discounted bus and rail fares, via the Young Scot NEC. 

After 31st January 2022, all Scottish residents aged 5-21 years are able to travel on access free bus transport in Scotland using either the Young Scot NEC or the National Entitlement Card. Children under 5 already get free bus fares. 

In Edinburgh, all residents living within Edinburgh are also entitled to free travel on the Edinburgh Trams.

Despite the Edinburgh Trams being included, the Glasgow Subway has not been included for Glasgow residents. This is due to local councils having the say on whether these schemes are included in concession travel.

Full-time volunteers from 22-26 years old are still able to get discounted bus and rail fares and, 16-18 years old are able to get discounted rail fares, as this carries on from the previous scheme.

Ferry Concessions 
Residents of the Western Isles, Orkney and Shetland also receive two free return ferry trips to the Scottish mainland if they receive free bus travel or the Young Scot travel discount.

Local concessionary travel 
In some areas of Scotland, additional concessionary travel options are available. For example, the NEC issued to those residing in the Strathclyde Partnership for Transport (SPT)  area gives access to additional rail and Glasgow Subway concessions. Similarly, residents of Edinburgh can travel free on the Edinburgh tram using an NEC.

Young Scot NEC

Young Scot is the national youth information and citizenship charity, supported by the Scottish Government, for 11-25 year olds in Scotland. All young people of this age in Scotland are eligible to receive a Young Scot National Entitlement Card.

The Young Scot NEC is issued under the Proof of Age Standards Scheme and can therefore be used by a young person to access to age-restricted goods and services. In addition to the travel concessions for Young People when they are eligible, the card also entitles the holder to a number of services and discounts that Young Scot provide.

Other local NEC uses 
The NEC has been used for a number of different additional purposes since its introduction. Common uses include access to cashless catering in schools, a means of providing library or leisure membership, or discounted admissions on the basis of age or disability. In other local authority areas, the card may only be used for the national purposes outlined above. Local authorities will normally issue the NEC when a valid application for a service using the NEC is received.

Card issuing authorities

See also

 National Health Service Central Register (Scotland)
 Identity Cards Act 2006

References

Public transport in Scotland
Authentication methods
Identity documents of the United Kingdom
Youth in Scotland
Databases in Scotland